Martin Bodmer (November 13, 1899 – March 22, 1971) was a Swiss bibliophile, scholar and collector.

Biography 
Martin Bodmer was the son of wealthy parents born in Zurich, Switzerland, where he lived until 1948. His father died in 1916 leaving a very large fortune. In 1918, Bodmer began studying German language, then gave up and took a trip to United States and Paris. He studied a few semesters of philosophy and in 1921 he founded the Gottfried Keller Prize, a renowned Swiss literary award. In 1930 he founded the bimonthly "Corona," which was published until 1943 in Munich. With the start of the Second World War he devoted himself to the International Committee of the Red Cross and became its vice president. During the Second World War, many famous writers and journalists stayed in Bodmer's house in Zurich, including Rudolf Borchardt, Selma Lagerlöf, Rudolf Alexander Schröder, and Paul Valéry.

He started collecting rare books at the age of 16 and devoted all his life to create an extraordinary library of world literature. Bodmer selected the works centering on what he saw as the five pillars of world literature: the Bible, Homer, Dante Alighieri, William Shakespeare and Johann Wolfgang von Goethe. He prioritized autographs and first editions. In 1928 the villa was too small for his collection and he bought an adjacent former school building to accommodate his books. After the war he resumed his long-standing project to build a "Library of world literature", or "Bodmer Library" in specially designed buildings, collecting the most significant messages of humankind, including not only literature and art, but also religion, history and politics. He left Zurich and transferred its collection to Cologny, just outside Geneva, on the shores of Lake Geneva.

Bodmer amassed 150,000 works in eighty languages, including first editions of major works, the Papyrus 66 which is one of the oldest almost completely preserved manuscripts of John's Gospel (2nd century), the original of Grimms' Fairy Tales, the only copies of the Gutenberg Bible  and the Shakespeare First Folio in Switzerland, a string quintet by Mozart, the prose version of Gotthold Lessing's Nathan the Wise, Gustave Flaubert's Madame Bovary, Thomas Mann's Lotte in Weimar, original editions of Don Quixote, Goethe's Faust, and valuable papyri, known as Bodmer Papyri, from ancient times, including a papyrus manuscript dating to the third century of the complete Dyskolos, an Ancient Greek comedy by Menander, which was recovered and published in 1959. Bodmer extended its project to cuneiform tablets and ancient coins.

Before his death, Bodmer refused the proposal of an American millionaire who offered him $60 million (1971), and with his children’s consent placed his collection at the heart of the Martin Bodmer Foundation, a private cultural institution headquartered in Cologny, which continues to manage and expand the collection.

See also 
 Bodmer Library
 Bodmer Papyri

References

External links 
 Bodmer Foundation — official web-site (in French).
 Biography of Martin Bodmer (in French and German)

People from Zürich
1899 births
1971 deaths
Book and manuscript collectors
Swiss librarians